Fiona McLeod Hill  (born July 1973), formerly known as Fiona Cunningham, is a British political adviser. She served as Joint Downing Street Chief of Staff supporting prime minister Theresa May, alongside Nick Timothy, until her resignation following the 2017 general election.

Early life
Fiona Hill was born in Greenock, and attended St Stephen’s Roman Catholic Secondary School in Port Glasgow. Before turning to politics, she worked as a journalist in both the press and broadcast sectors; her experience included working for the Daily Record, The Scotsman and Sky News. She joined the Conservative Party press office in 2006, before spending a period at the British Chamber of Commerce, and then returning to work for the Conservatives.

Career

Home Office
From 2010, Hill worked alongside Theresa May in the Home Office as a media adviser. She left government after being forced to resign as May's special adviser in a 2014 dispute with Michael Gove over alleged extremism in schools, which culminated in her releasing a confidential letter on May's website, prompting then Prime Minister, David Cameron, to insist that May sack her. Hill then became an associate director of the Centre for Social Justice think tank, and in 2015 became a Director of lobbying firm Lexington Communications.

Downing Street
On 14 July 2016, following the resolution of the 2016 Conservative leadership election, Hill was appointed joint chief of staff to Theresa May, the day after May became Prime Minister.

Little of her own political stance is on public record. Unlike Timothy, with whom she shared the post of Chief of Staff for a year, she avoided writing opinion articles. James Kirkup, who worked with Hill as a journalist on The Scotsman, suggested "it's probably fair to say that Mrs May only talks about modern slavery [as a priority for government action] because of Ms Hill, and that's not the only issue of which that is true".

The 2017 general election saw the return of the Conservatives as a minority government, with their majority dependent on the Democratic Unionist Party, leading to widespread calls within the party for both Hill and Timothy to be sacked. According to reports, Hill irritated the Scottish Conservatives in particular. They complained of her excessive "interference" and of being told not to run a campaign too detached from the one run from London. Nevertheless, their leader Ruth Davidson chose to ignore the demand, and achieved a considerable increase in the number of Scottish MPs. This result was crucial in mitigating the loss of seats south of the border and appeared to question key elements of Hill and Timothy′s election strategy. Within days, and in the face of the growing backlash, both chiefs of staff resigned.

Personal life
While at Sky News Hill met Tim Cunningham, a TV executive, whom she married; the couple later divorced. Later senior civil servant Charles Farr became Hill's partner.

References

External links
 Twitter page

1973 births
Living people
People from Greenock
British political consultants
Conservative Party (UK) people
British special advisers
Date of birth missing (living people)
Commanders of the Order of the British Empire
Downing Street Chiefs of Staff